The 2014–15 Biathlon World Cup – Pursuit Men started on Saturday December 6, 2014 in Östersund and finished on Saturday March 21, 2015 in Khanty-Mansiysk. Martin Fourcade of France successfully defended his title.

Competition format
This is a pursuit competition. The biathletes' starts are separated by their time differences from a previous race, most commonly a sprint race. There are two prone shooting bouts and two standing bouts, in that order. The contestant crossing the finish line first is the winner.

To prevent awkward and/or dangerous crowding of the skiing loops, and overcapacity at the shooting range, World Cup Pursuits are held with only the 60 top ranking biathletes after the preceding race. The biathletes shoot (on a first-come, first-served basis) at the lane corresponding to the position they arrived for all shooting bouts.

Points are awarded for each event, according to each contestant's finish. When all events are completed. the contestant with the highest number of points is declared the season winner.

2013-14 Top 3 Standings

Medal winners

Standings

References

Pursuit Men